Isolator may refer to:

 Isolator (EP), a 2006 EP by Two Hours Traffic
 The Isolator, a 2015 Japanese light novel

Electronics
 Isolator (microwave), a two-port device that transmits microwave power in one direction only
 Isolator switch, used in electrical circuits
 Barrier isolator, a device that provides a physical barrier between a laboratory technician and a work process
 Optical isolator, a directional device in optical fiber communications
 Opto-isolator, a directional device in electronics
 Vibration isolator, any of various devices to isolate connected parts of an assembly from each other's vibrations
 Bushing (isolator), one type of vibration isolator

See also
 Isolation (disambiguation)
 Insulator (disambiguation)